George VI (1895–1952) was King of Great Britain and the British Dominions from 1936 to 1952 and Emperor of India from 1936 to 1948.

George VI may also refer to:
 George VI of Georgia (died 1313), king of Georgia from 1311
 George VI of Imereti (died 1722), Georgian nobleman, king of Imereti from 1702 to 1707
 George VI of Armenia (1868–1954), Catholicos of the Armenian Apostolic Church from 1945 to 1954
 King George VI Bridge, over the river Dee in Aberdeen, Scotland
 King George VI, one of the four Dreadnought-class submarines ordered for the Royal Navy
 King George VI, a GWR 6000 Class locomotive
 King George VI, a LMS Coronation Class locomotive

See also
 George IV (disambiguation) or George 4
 King George (disambiguation)